Punishing: Gray Raven (Japanese: パニシング：グレイレイヴン) is a mobile action role-playing game developed and published by Kuro Game. It was first released in China on December 5, 2019 and a year later on December 4, 2020 in Japan. The global release came out on July 16, 2021.

Gameplay
Punishing: Gray Raven has players control a squad of up to three characters, known as "Constructs", against various enemies. Storytelling is presented in a visual novel format, while combat is hack and slash action-based, with the player fighting enemies in real-time in various stages. During combat, different colored "Pings" can be obtained, which will fire off different skills. Chaining 3 Pings with the same color will execute a powerful version of that skill. Players may also evade enemy attacks, which will trigger a bullet time effect upon successful evasion, allowing the player to land additional hits to the enemy. Evading attacks will consume stamina, which prevents players from freely dodging all the time.

Constructs can be strengthened by leveling up and promoting them, as well as leveling weapons and equipping gears. Players can unlock additional Constructs by advancing the story, and more Constructs can be obtained via a gacha mechanic and in-game events. In-game currencies can be obtained through in-app purchases and playing the game, which are used to obtain Constructs and equipment through the gacha system. A pity system ensures that the player will receive rare items after a set number of pulls.

The game also features a housing system in the form of Dormitories. Players may decorate and move in Constructs to their dorms to improve their mood. Constructs can also be assigned chores to obtain in-game materials.

Plot
The story of game takes place in a post-apocalyptic world overrun by Corrupted cybernetic enemies caused by the Punishing Virus. The last remnants of mankind have escaped to the space station Babylonia. The player takes on the role as the Commandant of an elite squad of Constructs known as Gray Raven. The player will lead the squad to fight against the Corrupted and other opposing forces to retake the planet.

Characters
Gray Raven
Lucia
Voiced by: 小N (Chinese), 尾狐殿 (Cantonese), Yui Ishikawa (Japanese)
Liv
Voiced by: 多多poi (Chinese), 間踏梧桐 (Cantonese), Miku Itō (Japanese)
Lee
Voiced by: 夏侯落楓 (Chinese), 犬畏 (Cantonese), Yoshitsugu Matsuoka (Japanese)
Engineering Force
Karenina
Voiced by: 花铃 (Chinese), 东东 (Cantonese), Haruka Tomatsu (Japanese)
Purifying Force
Bianca
Voiced by: 云鹤追 (Chinese), 神明凌 (Cantonese), Ayako Kawasumi (Japanese)
Strike Hawk
Kamui
Voiced by: DK (Chinese), 夏侯落枫 (Cantonese), Jun Fukuyama (Japanese)
Chrome
Voiced by: 大白 (Chinese), ken (Cantonese), Daisuke Hirakawa (Japanese)
Wanshi
Voiced by: 孙鹏 (Chinese), 咩鹿君 (Cantonese), Akira Ishida (Japanese)
Cerberus
Vera
Voiced by: 江月 (Chinese), YUI (Cantonese), Inoue Marina (Japanese)
No. 21
Voiced by: 钱琛 (Chinese), P (Cantonese), Inori Minase (Japanese)
Art Association
Ayla
Voiced by: 巩大方 (Chinese), 傻莓酱 (Cantonese), Shizuka Ito (Japanese)
Selena
Voiced by: 柳知蕭 (Chinese), 以媛 (Cantonese), Satomi Sato (Japanese)
The Forsaken
Watanabe
Voiced by: 森中人 (Chinese), 星罗 (Cantonese), Yoshimasa Hosoya (Japanese)
Arctic Route Union
Rosetta
Voiced by: 贺文潇 (Chinese), 师欣 (Cantonese), Miyuki Sawashiro (Japanese)
Akidilek Trading Union
Sophia
Voiced by: 蔡娜 (Chinese), 萧萧 (Cantonese), Ami Koshimizu (Japanese)
Chang Yu
Voiced by: Kinsen (Chinese), 包少爷 (Cantonese), Natsuki Hanae (Japanese)
Kowloong
Qu
Voiced by: 叶知秋 (Chinese), 零叁 (Cantonese), Sayaka Ohara (Japanese)
Ascendents
Alpha 
Voiced by: 小N (Chinese), 尾狐殿 (Cantonese), Yui Ishikawa (Japanese)
Luna
Voiced by: 四白 (Chinese), 周海鲜 (Cantonese), Rie Kugimiya (Japanese)
Roland
Voiced by: 冷泉夜月 (Chinese), 碌斌 (Cantonese), Koji Yusa (Japanese)
Unaffiliated
Nanami
Voiced by: 赵爽 (Chinese), 岚风蜂蜜绿茶 (Cantonese), Minami Tanaka (Japanese)

Release
Kuro Game was criticized over their poor handling of Punishing: Gray Raven during its initial launch in China, notably regarding false gacha rate advertisement, and "over-rewarding" new players then taking back the rewards. Since then, the developers have been praised for their improved management of the game, regularly addressing player concerns such as game balance and improving their gacha system.

The global release was also scrutinized soon after launch, when players noticed that they received fewer rewards compared to other regions. Criticizing comments were also deleted from Punishing: Gray Raven's official Discord community, leading to a review bomb from angered players. Kuro Game published a statement to address the controversy.

Reception

Punishing: Gray Raven received "generally favorable reviews" according to review aggregator Metacritic. Pocket Gamer praised Punishing: Gray Raven as "a highly engaging game with one of the best storylines I’ve ever encountered so far". Screen Rant criticized the game's localization, but praised the combat system, comparing it with Honkai Impact 3rd for their similarities in gameplay. GamerBraves commended the game's optimization and "punishing but addictive combat". Multiplayer.it highlighted the long campaign and characters, but finds faults in the short missions and gacha elements. Noisy Pixel lauded the game's writing and gameplay, considering it one of the few "high-quality gacha greats".

As of July 2020, the game has surpassed 20 million downloads.

See also
 Action Taimanin
 Honkai Impact 3rd

References

External links
 Official English website

2019 video games
Action role-playing video games
Android (operating system) games
Android (robot) video games
Crossover video games
Free-to-play video games
Hack and slash games
Gacha games
IOS games
Post-apocalyptic video games
Science fantasy video games
Video games about robots
Video games developed in China
Video games featuring female protagonists